Holy Saviour of Priesca is a Roman Catholic pre-romanesque church, located in Priesca, next to Villaviciosa, Asturias, northern Spain. Only a few kilometres from the Church of San Salvador de Valdediós, it is amongst the latest examples of Asturian architecture.

Architecture 
With Alfonso III dead and the kingdom of Asturias divided among his sons, Asturian pre-romanesque architecture entered its last stage. Consecrated on September 24, 921, it has the architectural and decorative reference of the model laid down by the Church of San Julián de los Prados.

In the 17th and 18th centuries, it underwent several reconstructions, altering especially the structures adjoining the vestibule, by communicating them with the side aisles.
In 1936, during the Spanish civil war, the original roof burned but it kept most of its sculptured decoration and original paintings.

See also
Asturian art
Catholic Church in Spain

References

Sources

 

10th-century churches in Spain
Salvador de Priesca
Pre-Romanesque architecture in Asturias
Bien de Interés Cultural landmarks in Asturias